Pristimantis conspicillatus is a species of frog in the family Strabomantidae.
It is found in Brazil, Colombia, Ecuador, and Peru.
Its natural habitat is tropical moist lowland forests.

References

conspicillatus
Amphibians of Brazil
Amphibians of Colombia
Amphibians of Ecuador
Amphibians of Peru
Amphibians described in 1858
Taxa named by Albert Günther
Taxonomy articles created by Polbot